Nikolay Davydenko defeated Dominik Hrbatý in the final, 6–1, 6–2, 6–2 to win the singles tennis title at the 2006 Paris Masters.

Tomáš Berdych was the defending champion, but lost to Hrbatý in the quarterfinals.

Seeds
A champion seed is indicated in bold text while text in italics indicates the round in which that seed was eliminated.  All sixteen seeds received a bye into the second round.

Draw

Finals

Top half

Section 1

Section 2

Bottom half

Section 3

Section 4

References 
 2006 BNP Paribas Masters Draw
 2006 BNP Paribas Masters Qualifying Draw

Singles